The Russian Indoor Athletics Championships is an annual indoor track and field competition organised by the All-Russia Athletic Federation (ARAF), which serves as the Russian national championship for the sport. It was first held in 1992, following the independence of Russia after the dissolution of the Soviet Union and replacing the Soviet Indoor Athletics Championships. It is typically held as a three-day event in the Russian winter around mid to late February. The venue of the championships is usually in Moscow or Volgograd. A total of 24 athletics events are on the current programme, divided evenly between the sexes.

The first edition of the event in 1992 was poorly attended by the nation's best athletes, as a CIS Indoor Championships was also held the same year and was involved with international selection for the Unified Team.

Events
The following athletics events feature as standard on the Russian Indoor Championships programme:

 Sprint: 60 m, 400 m
 Distance track events: 800 m, 1500 m, 3000 m
 Hurdles: 60 m hurdles
 Jumps: long jump, triple jump, high jump, pole vault
 Throws: shot put
 Relays: 4 × 400 m relay

The following indoor national championships events are typically held separately:
Combined events: heptathlon (men), pentathlon (women)

The following events were formerly held at the competition but have since been abolished:
200 m
5000 m
2000 metres steeplechase
3000 metres steeplechase
 Racewalking: 5000 m (men), 3000 m (women)
 Relays: 4 × 200 m relay, 4 × 800 m relay

Editions

Championship records

Men

 * = Defunct events

Women

 * = Defunct events

See also
List of Russian records in athletics

References

 
Athletics competitions in Russia
National indoor athletics competitions
Recurring sporting events established in 1992
1992 establishments in Russia
Athletics Indoor